Q12 may refer to:

Q12 (New York City bus)
Beechcraft Q-12, an air-launched supersonic target drone
Yusuf (surah), of the Quran